Frederick Robertson may refer to:

 Frederick William Robertson (1816–1853), English divine
 Frederick Robertson (politician) (1909–2002), member of the Canadian House of Commons
 Fred Robertson (1911–1997), ice hockey player
 Frederick Robertson (English cricketer) (1843–1920), English cricketer
 Frederick Robertson (New Zealand cricketer) (1878-1966), New Zealand cricketer
 Frederick Robertson (judge) (1854–1918), judge and academic administrator